Ketling is a surname. Notable people with the surname include:
 Bronisław Prugar-Ketling (1891–1948), Polish general

 Fictional
 Hassling-Ketling of Elgin, a character in Henryk Sienkiewicz's novel Fire in the Steppe
 Krystyna (Krzysia) Ketling of Elgin, née Drohojowska, a character of the novel by Henryk Sienkiewicz

See also 
 Ketteler
 Kettler (surname)
 Kesseling

Low German surnames
Surnames of Scottish origin
Surnames of Polish origin